Konorzatka  is a village in the administrative district of Gmina Adamów, within Łuków County, Lublin Voivodeship, in eastern Poland.

The village has a population of 220.

References

Villages in Łuków County